Rydberg is a lunar impact crater that is located on the far side of the Moon, just past the southwest limb. It lies due south of the Mare Orientale, in the outer skirt of ejecta that surrounds the Orientale impact feature. Just to the southeast is the crater Guthnick.

This is a little-eroded crater formation with a relatively sharp edge. The inner walls do not have much terracing, although slumped piles of talus lie along the base. At the midpoint of the interior is a central ridge, with a low spur that runs halfway toward the southern inner wall.

This crater lies near the center of the Mendel-Rydberg Basin, a 630 km wide impact basin of Nectarian age.

This feature was named after the Swedish physicist Johannes Rydberg.

References

 
 
 
 
 
 
 
 
 
 
 
 

Impact craters on the Moon